Jerry Cirino is a Republican member of the Ohio Senate representing the 18th district. He was elected in 2020, defeating Democrat Betsy Rader with 60% of the vote. Prior to his election he served as Lake County Commissioner.

References

Lake Erie College alumni
Living people
Republican Party Ohio state senators
People from Kirtland, Ohio
21st-century American politicians
Year of birth missing (living people)